Covurlui County is one of the historic counties of Moldavia, Romania. The county seat was Galați.

In 1938, the county was disestablished and incorporated into the newly formed Ținutul Dunării, but it was re-established in 1940 after the fall of Carol II's regime - only to be abolished 10 years later by the Communist regime.

Geography
Covurlui County covered 2,662 km2 and was located in Moldavia. Currently, the territory that comprised Covurlui County is now mostly included in the Galați County, with a small northern part in the Vaslui County. In the interwar period, the county neighbored Tutova County to the north, Cahul and Ismail counties to the east, Tulcea County to the southeast, Brăila County to the south, Râmnicu Sărat County to the southwest, and Tecuci County to the west.

Administrative organization

Administratively, Covurlui County was originally divided into two districts (plăși): 
 Plasa Horincea
 Plasa Prutul de Jos

Subsequently, three more districts were established, reaching five in total:
Plasa I. G. Duca
Plasa Prutul de Sus
Plasa Siret

Population 
According to the 1930 census data, the county population was 210,006 inhabitants, ethnically comprising 83.7% Romanians, 9.5% Jews, 1.5% Russians, 1.4% Greeks, 1.1% Hungarians, as well as other minorities. From the religious point of view, the population comprised 87.0% Eastern Orthodox, 8% Jewish, 1.9% Roman Catholic, 0.3% Lutheran, 0.2% Reformed, 0.2% Greek Catholic, as well as other minorities.

Urban population 
In 1930, the county's urban population was 101,611 inhabitants, 68.2% Romanians, 19.1% Jews, 2.9% Russians, 2.9% Greeks, 2.1% Hungarians, 1.2% Germans, 0.5 Armenians, as well as other minorities. From the religious point of view, the urban population was composed of 73.9% Eastern Orthodox, 19.8% Jewish, 3.9% Roman Catholic, 0.7% Lutheran, 0.5% Reformed, 0.3% Greek-Catholic, as well as other minorities.

References

External links

  Covurlui County on memoria.ro

Former counties of Romania
1925 establishments in Romania
1938 disestablishments in Romania
1940 establishments in Romania
1950 disestablishments in Romania
States and territories established in 1925
States and territories disestablished in 1938
States and territories established in 1940
States and territories disestablished in 1950